Aima Noor-ul Ain Baig (born 10 March 1995) is a Pakistani singer. She is known for her appearances on Dunya News' program Mazaaq Raat from 2015 to 2017. She rose to fame from her songs in Lahore Se Aagey (2016), after which she gained popularity through many other soundtracks and her appearance in Coke Studio. She was awarded Tamgha-e-Fakhre-Imtiaz in August 2019.

Personal life
Baig was raised in Oman. Her father is an electrical engineer, and she has two sisters and two brothers. She is the fourth child. Her sister Komal Baig serves as her manager. Her mother died in 2017 after fighting cancer for six years. After losing her, Aima Baig dedicated her life to cancer patients and is actively working with Shaukat Khanum Memorial Cancer Hospital and Research Centre for charity.

Baig received her Bachelor of Film and Television from School Of Creative Arts, University of Lahore. TV anchor Mubashir Lucman, with whom she has sung a cover of "Summer Wine", is her father's friend, and she has written the script for his next film.

She announced her engagement to Shahbaz Shigri on 21 March 2021; they had been dating since they met while filming Parey Hut Love. In September 2022, she confirmed on Instagram that the couple had broken up.

Discography

Soundtracks

Films

Television

Coke Studio

Singles

TV commercials

Covers
"Summer Wine" (with Mubasher Lucman)
"Jag Ghoomeya"
"Bulleya" (Ae Dil Hai Mushkil)
"Laung Gawacha" (Bally Sagoo)
"Aye Rah-e-Haq Ke Shaheedon"
"Chura Liya Hai Tumne" (Yaadon Ki Baaraat)
"Sajania" (Masty)
"Cheap Thrills"
"Hasi" (Hamari Adhuri Kahani)
 "Dilbar Jani" (Noor Jehan)
 "Mujhe Dil Se Na Bhulana" (Aina)
 "Mera Bichraa Yaar" (Dhaani)
 "Balam Pichkari"
"Younhi" (with Atif Aslam at 16th Lux Style Awards)
"Baazi" (solo at #HBLPSL3 closing ceremony)
"Item Number" (Solo)
"Disco Deewane" (with Shuja Haider at #HBLPSL4 opening ceremony)
"Dosti" (from Hotline; at #HBLPSL4 closing ceremony)
"Kahani Suno 2.0" (original by Kaifi Khalil)
"Qaumi Taranah" (at #HBLPSL8 opening ceremony)

Awards and nominations

! Ref
|-
! style="background:#bfd7ff" colspan="5"|Lux Style Awards
|-
|2017
|"Kalabaaz Dil"
|rowspan="3"|Best Playback Singer(Female)
|rowspan="2" 
|
|-
|rowspan="2"|2018
|"Sadqa"
|rowspan="2"|
|-
|"Kaif o Suroor"
|rowspan=4 
|-
|rowspan="2"|2021
|"Raaz-e-Ulfat"
|rowspan=2|Best TV OST
|rowspan=2|
|-
|"O Zalim"
|-
|2022
|"Na Cher Malangaan Nu"
|Song of the Year
|
|-
! style="background:#bfd7ff" colspan="5"|Galaxy Lollywood Awards
|-
|2017
|"Kalabaaz Dil"
|rowspan="4"|Best Playback Singer(Female)
|rowspan="3" 
|
|-
|2018
|"Kaif o Suroor"
|
|-
|rowspan="2"|2019
|"Item Number"
|rowspan="2"|
|-
|"Yunhi Rastay Mai"
|
|-
! style="background:#bfd7ff" colspan="5"|Pakistan International Screen Award
|-
|rowspan="3"|2020
|rowspan="2"|"Dhola"
|Best Song
|rowspan="4" 
|rowspan="3"|
|-
|Best Song Critics Choice
|-
|"Do Bol"
|rowspan="2"|Best OST
|-
|rowspan="2"|2021
|"Raaz-e-Ulfat"
|rowspan="2"|
|-
|"Te Quiero Mucho"
|Singer of the Year (Jury)
|
|}

References

External links
 
 

Pakistani women singers
Pakistani women composers
Living people
1995 births